Michtam may refer to:
Miktam, a title used in six of the Psalms
a planet in the science fiction video game series Xenosaga.

See also 
Mitcham (disambiguation)